Steven Charles Bergwijn  (born 8 October 1997) is a Dutch professional footballer who plays as a winger for Eredivisie club Ajax and the Netherlands national team.

Club career

PSV
Bergwijn was born in Amsterdam to parents from Suriname. He started his career in the Ajax youth academy up to 2011, but due to a conflict with one of the trainers, chose to leave. He immediately signed to PSV, Bergwijn made his first-team debut for Jong PSV in the second division on 9 August 2014 against Achilles '29. He replaced Elvio van Overbeek after 77 minutes in a 2–0 home win.

He scored the third goal as PSV beat Ajax 3–0 to clinch the 2017–18 Eredivisie title.

Tottenham Hotspur
At the end of the January 2020 transfer window Bergwijn signed a five-year contract with Tottenham Hotspur in a deal worth a reported £26.7 million. He scored his first goal for the club in his Premier League debut, a 2–0 victory against Manchester City, and was also named Man of the Match by Sky Sports. On 6 March 2020, Bergwijn suffered a sprain to his left ankle in the match against Burnley which might have sidelined him for the rest of the season, but due to the Premier League break caused by COVID-19, Bergwijn had time to recover and was able to return to the starting eleven, scoring against Manchester United in Tottenham's first post-break match. 

On 19 January 2022, Bergwijn scored a brace against Leicester City in dramatic fashion, scoring both goals in injury time to give Spurs a 3–2 victory.

Ajax 
On 8 July 2022, Bergwijn returned to the Netherlands, signing a five-year contract with Ajax. The transfer fee paid to Tottenham Hotspur was of €31.25 million. This was the most expensive transfer in the history of the Eredivisie, breaking the record set when Ajax bought Sébastien Haller in 2021 (€22.5 million). On 14 August 2022, he scored a hat-trick in a 6–1 win over Groningen.

International career
Bergwijn earned his first full international call up when Ronald Koeman named him in the Netherlands squad in October 2018. He made his debut as a starter on 13 October 2018 in a 3–0 2018–19 UEFA Nations League A victory over Germany.

Career statistics

Club

International

As of match played 22 September 2022. Scores and results list the Netherlands' goal tally first. Score column indicates score after each Bergwijn goal.

Honours
PSV
Eredivisie: 2014–15, 2015–16, 2017–18
Johan Cruyff Shield: 2016

Tottenham Hotspur
EFL Cup runner-up: 2020–21

Individual
UEFA European Under-17 Championship Golden Player: 2014
UEFA European Under-17 Championship Team of the Tournament: 2014
Eredivisie Player of the Month: February 2018
Eredivisie Talent of the Month: August 2018; December 2018

References

External links
 Profile at the AFC Ajax website
 
 Steven Bergwijn at Voetbal International  – 
 Steven Bergwijn at OnsOranje  – 

1997 births
Living people
Footballers from Amsterdam
Dutch footballers
Netherlands youth international footballers
Netherlands under-21 international footballers
Netherlands international footballers
Association football wingers
Jong PSV players
PSV Eindhoven players
Tottenham Hotspur F.C. players
AFC Ajax players
Eerste Divisie players
Eredivisie players
Premier League players
2022 FIFA World Cup players
Dutch expatriate footballers
Expatriate footballers in England
Dutch expatriate sportspeople in England
Dutch sportspeople of Surinamese descent